Iván Alonso Garrido Pinzón (born 2 June 1981) is a former Colombian professional footballer.

References

External links
 Player profile - Bnei Yehuda's website
 

1981 births
Living people
Colombian footballers
Association football defenders
Atlético Bucaramanga footballers
Independiente Santa Fe footballers
Bnei Yehuda Tel Aviv F.C. players
Hapoel Be'er Sheva F.C. players
Atlético Huila footballers
Uniautónoma F.C. footballers
Alianza F.C. footballers
Colombian expatriate footballers
Categoría Primera A players
Israeli Premier League players
Expatriate footballers in Israel
Expatriate footballers in El Salvador
Colombian expatriate sportspeople in Israel
Colombian expatriate sportspeople in El Salvador
People from Bucaramanga
Sportspeople from Santander Department